Samir Memišević (born 13 August 1993) is a Bosnian professional footballer who plays as a centre-back for UAE Pro League club Al-Nasr.

Memišević started his professional career at Slaven Živinice, before joining Sloboda Tuzla in 2012. The following year, he moved to Teleoptik. Later that year, he switched to Bežanija. A year later, he went back to Teleoptik. He signed with Radnik Bijeljina in 2014. Two years later, Memišević was transferred to Groningen. In 2020, he joined Hebei, who loaned him to Beijing Guoan in 2022. He moved to Al-Nasr in 2023.

Memišević made his senior international debut for Bosnia and Herzegovina in 2016, earning 3 caps until 2019.

Club career

Early career
Memišević came through Slaven Živinice's youth setup. He made his professional debut in 2011 at the age of 17.

In the summer of 2012, he joined Sloboda Tuzla. On 28 October, he scored his first professional goal in a triumph over Iskra Bugojno.

In March 2013, Memišević moved to Serbian side Teleoptik, which serves as Partizan's feeder team. In July, he switched to Bežanija. In January 2014, he returned to Teleoptik.

In August, he signed with Radnik Bijeljina.

Groningen
In July 2016, Memišević was transferred to Dutch outfit Groningen for an undisclosed fee. He made his official debut for the club on 13 August against Excelsior. On 29 April 2018, he scored his first goal for Groningen against the same opponent.

In April 2019, Memišević extended his contract until June 2021.

He played his 100th game for the side against Fortuna Sittard on 30 November.

Later stage of career
In February 2020, Memišević joined Chinese club Hebei. In April 2022, he was sent on a season-long loan to Beijing Guoan.

In January 2023, he moved to an Emirati club Al-Nasr.

International career
In May 2016, Memišević received his first senior call-up to Bosnia and Herzegovina, for a friendly game against Spain and 2016 Kirin Cup. He debuted against Spain on 29 May.

Personal life
Memišević's father Midhat was also a professional footballer.

He married his long-time girlfriend Sanida in August 2021.

Career statistics

Club

International

Honours
Radnik Bijeljina
Bosnian Cup: 2015–16

References

External links

1993 births
Living people
Sportspeople from Tuzla
Bosniaks of Bosnia and Herzegovina
Bosnia and Herzegovina Muslims
Bosnia and Herzegovina footballers
Bosnia and Herzegovina international footballers
Bosnia and Herzegovina expatriate footballers
Association football central defenders
FK Sloboda Tuzla players
FK Teleoptik players
FK Bežanija players
FK Radnik Bijeljina players
FC Groningen players
Hebei F.C. players
Beijing Guoan F.C. players
Al-Nasr SC (Dubai) players
First League of the Federation of Bosnia and Herzegovina players
Serbian First League players
Premier League of Bosnia and Herzegovina players
Eredivisie players
Chinese Super League players
UAE Pro League players
Expatriate footballers in Serbia
Expatriate footballers in the Netherlands
Expatriate footballers in China
Expatriate footballers in the United Arab Emirates
Bosnia and Herzegovina expatriate sportspeople in Serbia
Bosnia and Herzegovina expatriate sportspeople in the Netherlands
Bosnia and Herzegovina expatriate sportspeople in China
Bosnia and Herzegovina expatriate sportspeople in the United Arab Emirates